Nolichucky Dam is a dam on the Nolichucky River near Greeneville, Tennessee, maintained by the Tennessee Valley Authority (TVA).

The dam has an ogee-type spillway with a flashboard crest.

Nolichucky Dam was built by the Tennessee Eastern Electric Company (TEEC) in 1912-1913 for hydroelectricity generation.  The dam was initially equipped with two generators, and TEEC added two more in 1923.  In 1941, the East Tennessee Light & Power Company obtained ownership of the dam when it purchased TEEC's assets.  The Tennessee Valley Authority purchased East Tennessee Light & Power in 1945 for a lump sum that included $1.47 million for Nolichucky Dam.  TVA made various improvements, and at its height, the dam was capable of producing 10,640 kilowatts of electricity.  TVA used the dam for power generation until 1972, when sediment buildup in Davy Crockett Lake made continued electricity generation impractical.  The dam and reservoir are now used for flood control and recreation; the reservoir is a wildlife management area.  The continued sediment buildup is resulting in upstream flooding.

References

External links

Nolichucky Dam and Davy Crockett Reservoir — TVA site
Davy Crockett Reservoir — Tennessee Wildlife Resources Agency
Archives of Appalachia - East Tennessee Light and Power Company Records

Dams on the French Broad River
Tennessee Valley Authority dams
Dams in Tennessee
Buildings and structures in Greene County, Tennessee
Dams completed in 1913
1913 establishments in Tennessee